Saboten (サボテン) (English: Cactus) is the fifth single by the Japanese rock band Porno Graffitti. It was released on December 6, 2000.

Track listing

References

2000 singles
Porno Graffitti songs
SME Records singles
2000 songs
Oricon Weekly number-one singles